Frank John Ernaga (August 22, 1930 – April 30, 2018) was an American professional baseball player. The native of Susanville, California, had a seven-season (1953–1959) pro career. 

He attended Lassen Community College and the University of California, Los Angeles. In his MLB debut for the Cubs on May 24, 1957, Ernaga hit a home run against Baseball Hall of Fame pitcher Warren Spahn in his first Major League at-bat. Then, in his second plate appearance, he tripled off Spahn, as the Cubs won, 5–1, at Wrigley Field. In his first 11 at bats with the Cubs, through May 28, Ernaga had six hits (.545). However, he leveled off, and by June 11, his average had dropped to .320. He returned to the minor leagues until after September 1. But he collected only four more hits in 18 at bats during the remainder of his career with the Cubs, from late-season 1957 through the early weeks of 1958.

All told, as a major leaguer, Ernaga collected 12 hits (with three doubles, two triples and two homers) and seven runs batted in. He batted .279.

Sources

External links
, or Baseball Almanac

1930 births
2018 deaths
Baseball players from California
Burlington Bees players
Charlotte Hornets (baseball) players
Chicago Cubs players
Fort Worth Cats players
Major League Baseball outfielders
People from Susanville, California
Portland Beavers players
San Antonio Missions players
Stockton Ports players
Tulsa Oilers (baseball) players
UCLA Bruins baseball players